Pueblo is a Spanish-language term referring to a town or other small settlement, or to the population of a country.

 Pueblo may also refer to:

 Puebloan peoples, a Native American people/tribe in the Southwestern U.S.
 The traditional village style of Puebloan peoples
 Pueblo Revival architecture—a revival of the original style
 Pueblo, Colorado, a U.S. city
 Pueblo West, Colorado a separate independent unincorporated community west of Pueblo, Colorado 
 Pueblo, Indiana, an unincorporated community
 Pueblo Supermarkets, Puerto Rican supermarket chain
 , a United States warship and namesake of the "Pueblo Incident" in 1968
 Pueblo (film), a 1973 American television drama film that aired on ABC
 "Pueblo" (game), a board game
 In Spanish colonial New Spain, used as part of many place names (including in today's United States, often in the form "Pueblo de..." e.g. Pueblo de Los Angeles)
Pueblo, Corozal, Puerto Rico, a barrio
Pueblo, Lares, Puerto Rico, a barrio
Pueblo, Moca, Puerto Rico, a barrio
Pueblo, Rincón, Puerto Rico, a barrio
Pueblo, San Juan, Puerto Rico, a barrio